Text sims are computer or video games that focus on using a text based element to simulate some aspect of the real world. Text sims typically focus on creating as detailed a simulation of their object as possible, and therefore, other traditional game elements are often set aside in pursuit of creating an accurate simulation experience for the user. This pursuit of accurate simulation often comes at the expense of some or most audio or graphical elements. Numerous examples of soundless and graphic-light text sims exist.

The best selling text sim of all time is the Championship Manager/Football Manager series, published by Sports Interactive games, sold in America as Worldwide Soccer Manager. This soccer text simulation is an advanced version of a text sim with a 2D graphical sim engine for soccer games.

There are several genres of text sims. The most popular may be the sports text sim. In addition to the above-mentioned Football Manager, there are several text-based sim games in baseball, football, basketball, hockey, even wrestling. This genre is typically heavy is stats, and some games have been compared to spreadsheets with all of their detail to simulating the true environment of the sport. One of the flagship products of the sports text sim is Front Office Football, which is renowned for creating a very accurate experience as a general manager of a professional football team while also retaining a heavy statistical engine. Out of the Park Baseball is another example of such a sports sim with a true-to-life experience.

Another genre of text sims is the tycoon genre. Although early entrants in the tycoon genre were graphically based, such as Railroad Tycoon and later Roller Coaster Tycoon, a large number of tycoon clones arose. The tycoon genre focuses on an economic simulation of one or more commercial elements. Many recent budget tycoon games have more in common with text sims than the original games, often retaining graphics merely as an interface to appeal to the general audience. Examples of these games include Coffee Tycoon, where a player runs a coffee shop franchise; Hollywood Mogul, where the player creates and runs a movie studio; and Starship Tycoon where the player manages a merchant spaceship plying the trade routes in the future. One of the earliest text sims was a simplistic economics-based game, called Lemonade Stand, where the player takes on the role of a child managing his lemonade stand.

A third text sim genre is the political simulation. Political enterprises such as elections lend themselves well to the statistics-oriented text sim gaming. These text sims often focus on elections, although a few chose instead to focus on the running on a country. Due to the nature of this genre, it often relies on a graphical interface, typically a map. However, the game information is delivered in a text-based format. Examples of this genre include The Political Machine and Power Politics, where the player tries to win an election for the American Presidency.

Yet another text sim genre is the real world simulation. These text sims try to manage a real world situation of some sort in a text based engine. Often this genre will try to use statistics to figure out some element of life. A recent example of this genre is Kudos, where a player simulates the life of a young person in their early twenties trying to decide what to do with life.

Popular Text Sims 
Sports Sims:
Baseball Century
Be The Coach Basketball
Bowl Bound College Football
Blue Chip College Football
Baseball Mogul
CSFBL (Computer Simulated Fantasy Baseball League)
Deeproute
Diamond Mind Baseball
Draft Day Sports: Pro Basketball
Draft Day Sports: College Basketball
Eastside Hockey Manager series
Extreme Warfare
Fastbreak Basketball
Fastbreak College Basketball
Football Manager
Football Mogul
Football War Room
Footy Fanatic
Franchise Hockey Manager
Front Office Football
Hattrick
Hooves of Thunder
Inside the Park Baseball
Jump Serve Volleyball
Jump Shot Basketball
Mulligan Tour Golf
QuarterPole Plus
QOOTY
Out of the Park Baseball
Playasport Tennis Sim
Professional Football Simulator
PureSim
Rapid Stats Baseball
Sick as a Parrot
Strat-O-Matic Baseball, Basketball, Football & Hockey
Front Office Football: The College Years
Title Bout Championship Boxing
Total College Basketball
Total Extreme Wrestling
Total Pro Basketball
Total Pro Football
Total Pro Golf
Tournament Dreams College Basketball
Turn For Home Horse Racing

Tycoon/Business Sims:
Chart Wars 3
Coffee Tycoon
Hollywood Mogul
Lemonade Stand
Lemonade Tycoon
Music Wars
Music Maven
Railroad Tycoon
Starship Tycoon
TV Manager
Wall Street Raider

Political Sims:
Diplomacy
The Political Machine
Power Politics
President 2000

Simulation video games